Horodnic de Sus is a commune located in Suceava County, in the historical region of Bukovina, northeastern Romania. It is composed of a single village, namely Horodnic de Sus. A separate commune until 1950, it was a village of Horodnic Commune until 2003, when Horodnic de Sus was split off to form a separate commune and Horodnic was renamed Horodnic de Jos.

Natives 

 Iulian Vesper

References 

Communes in Suceava County
Localities in Southern Bukovina